Parliamentary elections were held in Bulgaria on 30 May 1976. The Fatherland Front, dominated by the Bulgarian Communist Party, was the only organisation to contest the election; all candidate lists had to be approved by the Front. The Front nominated one candidate for each constituency. Of the 400 candidates 272 were members of the Communist Party, 100 were members of the Bulgarian Agrarian National Union and the remaining 28 were unaffiliated. Voter turnout was reportedly 99.9%.

Results

References

Bulgaria
1976 in Bulgaria
Parliamentary elections in Bulgaria
One-party elections
Single-candidate elections
1976 elections in Bulgaria
May 1976 events in Europe